Chitradurga is a city and the headquarters of Chitradurga district, which is located on the valley of the Vedavati river in the central part of the Indian state of Karnataka. Chitradurga is a place with historical significance which is located to the North West about 200 km from the state capital Bengaluru.
Chitradurga is a major tourist hub in Karnataka. 

The city is famous for its 15th-century fort, which is locally known as Kallina Kote or Stone Fortress. This is formed of two Kannada words: ‘Kallina’ means "Stone's" and Kote means "Fort". Other names used in Kannada are ‘Ukkina Kote": "Steel Fort" (metaphorically used to mean an impregnable fort) and ‘Yelusuttina Kote’: "Seven Circles Fort".

Etymology
Chitradurga gets its name from Chitrakaldurga (meaning picturesque fort), an umbrella-shaped lofty hill found here. Chitradurga was also known by the names Chitradurg, Chitrakaladurga, and Chittaldurg. Chittaldrug (or Chitaldrug or Chittledroog) was the official name used during the period of British rule. It was also known as Farkhabad during Tippu sultan rule.

History
Chitradurga features bold rock hills and picturesque valleys, with huge towering boulders in numerous shapes.  It is known as the "stone fortress" (Kallina Kote). According to the epic Mahabharatha, a man-eating Rakshasa named Hidimba and his sister Hidimbi lived on the hill. Hidimba was a source of terror to everyone around, while Hidimbi was a peace-loving rakshasa. When the Pandavas came with their mother Kunti in the course of their exile, Bhima had a duel with Hidimba in which Hidimba was killed. Bhima married Hidimbi and they had a son named Ghatotkacha, who had magical powers. Legend has it the boulders were part of the arsenal used by Bhima during that duel. The boulders on which a major part of the city was developed belong to the oldest rock formation in the country.

Timmana Nayaka, a chieftain under the Vijayanagar Empire, was appointed as governor of Chitradurga as a reward from the Vijayanagara ruler for his excellence in military services.  This was the beginning of the rule of the Nayakas of Chitradurga.  His son Obana Nayaka is known by the name Madakari Nayaka (1588 CE). (He was the last ruler of Chitradurga. His name comes from his ability to have suppressed the arrogance- "Mada" of a particular troublesome elephant- "Kari").  Madakari Nayaka's son Kasturi Rangappa (1602) succeeded him and consolidated the kingdom to rule peacefully. As he had no heirs to succeed him, his adopted son, the apparent heir, was enthroned. But he was killed a few months later by the Dalavayis.

Chikkanna Nayaka (1676), the brother of Madakari Nayaka II, served on the throne. His brother succeeded him in 1686 with the title Madakari Nayaka III.  The Dalawayis overthrow of Madakari Nayaka III's rule gave an opportunity to one of their distant relatives, Bharamappa Nayaka, to ascend the throne in 1689.  He is known as the greatest of the Nayaka rulers. The subjects of Chitradurga suffered through the brief reigns of the successive rulers, which resulted in volatile conditions. The Hiri Madakari Nayaka IV (1721), Kasturi Rangappa Nayaka II (1748), Madakari Nayaka V (1758) ruled this area, but there is not much documentation of their rule.

Legend of Onake Obavva

During the reign of Madakari Nayaka, the town of Chitradurga was besieged by troops of Hyder Ali. A chance sighting of a woman entering the Chitradurga fort through an opening in the rocks led to a clever plan by Hyder Ali to send his soldiers through the hole. The guard on duty near that hole had gone home for lunch. Obavva, the wife of that guard, was passing by the hole to collect water, when she noticed soldiers emerging into the fort. Obavva was carrying an Onake (a long wooden club meant for pounding paddy grains). 

She killed Hyder Ali's soldiers one by one as they attempted to enter the fort through the opening and moved the dead. Over a short period of time, hundreds of soldiers entered and fell, without raising any suspicion. 
After returning from lunch, Obavva's husband was shocked to see Obavva standing with a blood-stained Onake and hundreds of dead enemy bodies around her. Together both wife and husband beat up most of the soldiers. But as both were about to finish off the soldiers, Obavva died. 

The opening in the rocks remains as a historical marker for this account. The Tanniru doni, the well that Obavva was going to when she saw the invading soldiers, has also survived. Though Obavva saved the fort on that occasion, Madakari Nayaka could not repel another attack in 1779 by Hyder Ali. In the ensuing battle, the fort of Chitradurga fell to the invader. Obavva, like Kittur Rani Chennamma, remains a legend, especially to the women of Karnataka.

Geography
It has an average elevation of 732 metres (2401 ft).

Chitradurga city is well connected to Bengaluru, Mysuru, Mangaluru, Davanagere, Hubballi, Hospet, Bellary, Shivamogga, Tumakuru, Vijayapura, Belagavi by road and through railways.
Both NH-4 & NH-13 meets at Chitradurga City.

Geology: National Geological Monument 
What is known as "Pillow Lava" near the village of Maradihalli, Chitradurga District, Karnataka, has been designated as a National Geological Monument of India by the Geological Survey of India (GSI). They are protected and maintained to promote geotourism. The Maradihalli group is considered one of the best examples of this phenomenon in the world. They formed within the Chitradurga schist belt of Dharwar Group, when hot molten lava erupted under water and solidified quickly while cooling as forms of roughly spherical or rounded pillow-shapes. These rounded forms are a few feet or less in size. This pillow lava has been dated to 2500 million years.

Maradihalli is 16 km southeast of Chitradurga town and 4 km north of Ayamangala village, on the NH-4 (Bangalore –Pune). The area can be accessed by metalled road via Ayamangala, which is about 180 km from Bangalore.

Climate
The climate here is considered to be a local steppe climate. During the year, there is little rainfall in Chitradurga. The Köppen-Geiger climate classification is BSh. The temperature here averages 25.3 °C. The rainfall here averages 576 mm.

Demographics
 India census, Chitradurga had a population of 1,25,170. Males constitute 51% of the population and females 49%.  Chitradurga has an average literacy rate of 76%, higher than the national average of 59.5%; with male literacy of 80% and female literacy of 72%.  11% of the population is under 6 years of age.

Administration
Chitradurga city is administered by the Chitradurga city municipal council.

Renewable Energy
Chitradurga situated in a hilly region is also known to experience wind currents throughout the year making it a suitable place to set up wind mills and wind farms. There are several Wind-Power based power plants located around Chitradurga and most of the hills are embellished with wind mills which can be seen while entering the city. These wind farms have a total installed capacity of 49.7 MW.

Historical Places

Chitradurga Fort
Chitradurga Fort was built between the 10th and 18th centuries by the kings various dynasties during that period which are Rashtrakutas, Kalyana Chalukyas, Hoysalas, Vijayanagar and Nayakas of Chitradurga. After Hyder Ali illegally Captured the fort from the last ruler of Chitradurga Madakari Nayaka in the year 1779. It comprises a series of seven enclosure walls in Kannada. On the upper part of the fort Eighteen ancient temples can be found and in the lower part of the fort there is one huge temple. Among these temples the oldest and most interesting is the Hidambeshwara temple. The masjid was an addition during Hyder Ali's rule. The fort's many interconnecting tanks were used to harvest rainwater, and the fort was said to never suffer from a water shortage. This seemingly impregnable fort has 19 gateways, 38 posterior entrances, a palace, a mosque, granaries, oil pits, four secret entrances and water tanks. Murugha Mutt in Chitradurga, nearby to this place also has historical significance.

Chandravalli
Chandravalli caves is located amidst three hills namely Chitradurga, Cholagudda and Kirubanakallu. These caves are a never-ending maze of steep steps that lead into passageways, rooms and ante-rooms where kings from the Kadamba, Satavahana and Hoysala dynasties resided. And saints of the Ankali Math of Belgaum meditated in the temples. These caves are well ventilated but there is no light as its pitch dark inside the secret rooms that's why the kings used these rooms in case there was a threat of an intrusion.

Gallery

See also
 Ajjappanahalli, Chitradurga

References 

Former capital cities in India
Cities and towns in Chitradurga district
Cities in Karnataka